Battavarapalli is a village in the Hosur taluk of Krishnagiri district, Tamil Nadu, India.Batavarapalli village having 3 types of community (1)BC, (2)MBC, (3)SC it's means, Achari(BC), Kurubas(MBC) and Dravidians(SC).
Here speaking Telugu is BC and SC, Kannada Speakers is MBC....

References 

 

Villages in Krishnagiri district